Dragon Harper is a science fiction novel by the American-Irish author Anne McCaffrey and her son Todd McCaffrey, part of the Dragonriders of Pern series that she initiated in 1967. Published forty years later, it was the twenty-first in the series.

Dragon Harper and the previous novels Dragon's Kin and Dragon's Fire feature the character Kindan as a boy and young man, about 500 years after landing on Pern (500 AL). They were the first collaborations by mother and son.

Plot description
Similar to Moreta: Dragonlady of Pern and Nerilka's Story (near the end of the Sixth Pass), this book is set in a time of a pandemic that threatens human life on Pern (just before the third return of Thread, or Third Pass).

The story focuses on the character Kindan, featured in Dragon's Kin, who has taken a position as an apprentice at the Harper Hall. In the school-like setting, Kindan has to deal with a bully, a blossoming forbidden relationship, and his role as a protector for new female apprentices after the Masterharper breaks the former taboo against female harpers. The book then deals with an influenza-like pandemic that threatens the lives of holders, as the Weyrs must maintain a quarantine to keep their rosters healthy enough to fight the next Threadfall.

The story additionally explains the loss of many of the records kept prior to, during and after colonization, further reducing the Pernese connection with its off-planet origins.

Notes

References

External links
 
 Dragon Harper in Ten Minutes – A Parody

2007 American novels
2007 fantasy novels
2007 science fiction novels
Dragonriders of Pern books
Collaborative novels
Novels by Anne McCaffrey
Novels by Todd McCaffrey
2007 Irish novels